Weverton Guilherme da Silva Souza (born 15 June 1999), simply known as Weverton, is a Brazilian footballer who plays as a right back for Ponte Preta, on loan from Red Bull Bragantino.

Club career
Weverton signed for Cruzeiro in early 2019.

International career
Weverton was called up to the Brazil squad in May 2019 to gain experience. A video of him nutmegging compatriot Neymar went viral online later that month.

Career statistics

References

External links

1999 births
Living people
People from Maceió
Brazilian footballers
Association football defenders
Campeonato Brasileiro Série A players
Campeonato Brasileiro Série B players
Figueirense FC players
Cruzeiro Esporte Clube players
Red Bull Bragantino players
CR Vasco da Gama players
Sportspeople from Alagoas